"Simple Man", is a song written and recorded by the Charlie Daniels Band . It was released in August 1989 as the lead single from their album of the same name.

Content
The song is the lament of a self-proclaimed honest man, who expresses frustration at barely getting by despite making an honest living, while dishonest politicians and criminals are allowed to get away with anything. Expressing frustration at a judicial system that he believes is too lenient with drug dealers, rapists and child abusers, he suggests severe forms of justice, ("Now if I had my way with people sellin' dope/I'd take a big tall tree and a short piece of rope/I'd hang 'em up high and let 'em swing 'til the sun goes down") and allowing swamp animals such as alligators to eat criminals ("Just take them rascals out in the swamp/Put 'em on their knees and tie 'em to a stump/Let the rattlers and the bugs and the alligators do the rest"). The man blames a society that has forsaken God and as a result has become a lawless society, then reaffirms his support of the death penalty for the most severe crimes ("The Good Book says it so I know it's the truth/An eye for an eye and a tooth for a tooth''").

Music video
The music video was directed by Larry Boothby and premiered in late 1989.

Chart performance

References

External links
 

1989 singles
Charlie Daniels songs
Songs written by Charlie Daniels
Song recordings produced by James Stroud
Epic Records singles
1989 songs